Doug Rudham (3 May 1926 – 13 August 1991) was a South African footballer who played as a goalkeeper for Liverpool F.C. in The Football League. Rudham signed for Liverpool after impressing their staff while he was on tour in England with the South African national team. Rudham became first-choice goalkeeper during the 1954–55 season, despite conceding nine goals in a defeat to Birmingham City F.C. The next seasons saw Rudham lose his place in the Liverpool goal following the arrival of Tommy Younger from Hibernian F.C. He made only six appearances during his next three seasons at the club and left in May 1960.

References

1926 births
Sportspeople from Johannesburg
South African soccer players
South African expatriate soccer players
South Africa international soccer players
White South African people
Association football goalkeepers
Liverpool F.C. players
South African expatriate sportspeople in England
Expatriate footballers in England
English Football League players
1991 deaths
Jewish Guild players
South African people of English descent
Rangers F.C. (South Africa) players